Trond Sverre Hansen (born 27 January 1964 in Narvik, Norway) is a Norwegian jazz musician (drums). He is the son of jazz trombonist, Viggo Hansen and is considered one of the most prominent Norwegian drummers in the bebop genre.

Career 
Hansen debuted at the age of 14 with the legendary north-Norwegian guitarist Thorgeir Stubø, and participated in his quartet (1981–82). In the early 1980s he also played within "Samasjyen" in Harstad, and was, in other words a very young contributor to Narviks vital jazz scene at this time. He appeared in Erling Wicklund's show Ung norsk jazz at NRK in the early 1990s, and played with regional musician group "Jazz i Nord" together with the pianist Jørn Øien, bassist Konrad Kaspersen and trombonist Øystein B. Blix. This ensemble is documented on the album Song, Fall Soft (1995) with vocalist Marit Sandvik.

Hansen joined the Kjell Bartholdsen Quintet at "Festspillene i Harstad" 1984, collaborated within Øystein Norvoll Quintet at Kongsberg Jazzfestival in 1988, and was part of the Ernst-Wiggo Sandbakk Group in 1989–90. The combination Kaspersen/Hansen is a strong jazz accompaniment, and has laid the foundation for many constellations, among them Hallgeir Pedersen Trio (from 1999) which he is a permanent member of. His contribution here can be heard on the plates West Coast Blues (2002) Wistful (2004) and Bluero (2006). Another release Hansen contributes in is the album Monk Moods (1994) with the pianist Knut Kristiansen.

Honors 
1982: "Dølajazz" scholarship
1999: Stubøprisen

Discography 
1987: Den Glade Pessimisten (OK Produksjoner), with Ragnar Olsen & Sverre Kjelsberg
1995: Song, Fall Soft (Taurus Records), with Marit Sandvik & "Jazz I Nord»
1995: Monk Moods (Odin Records), with Knut Kristiansen
2002: West Coast Blues (Hot Club Records), within Hallgeir Pedersen Trio
2004: Wistful (Hot Club Records), within Hallgeir Pedersen Trio
2006: Bluero (Hot Club Records), within Hallgeir Pedersen Trio
2008: Feather, But No Wings (Reflect Records), with Alf Kjellman
2009: Tur (NorCD), with "Tromsø Kunstforsyning" & Øystein B. Blix

References

External links 

Avant-garde jazz musicians
20th-century Norwegian drummers
21st-century Norwegian drummers
Norwegian jazz drummers
Male drummers
Norwegian jazz composers
Musicians from Narvik
1964 births
Living people
20th-century drummers
Male jazz composers
20th-century Norwegian male musicians
21st-century Norwegian male musicians